Antušava (formerly) is a village in Kėdainiai district municipality, in Kaunas County, in central Lithuania. According to the 2011 census, the village has a population of 16 people. It is located 3 km from Gudžiūnai, between Antušava and Skirpstynė forests.

Demography

References

Villages in Kaunas County
Kėdainiai District Municipality